Nilüfer is the Turkish word for "water lily", from Persian nilufar (نیلوفر), which is ultimately derived from the Sanskrit word for the blue lotus, nīlotpala (नीलोत्पल). It is a popular feminine given name in Turkey.

The term may specifically refer to:

Given name
 Nilüfer Çınar Çorlulu (born 1962), Turkish Woman International Master (WIM) of chess
 Nilüfer Göle (born 1953), Turkish-French sociologist
 Nilüfer Hatun (14th century), mother of Ottoman Sultan Murad I (1326–1389)
 Nilüfer Örer (born 1976), Turkish pop singer
 Nilüfer Verdi (born 1956), Turkish jazz pianist
 Nilüfer Yumlu (born 1955), Turkish pop singer whose stage name is simply "Nilüfer"
 Nilüfer Yanya (born 1996), a British-Turkish singer-songwriter from London

Places
 Nilüfer, Bursa, an urban district of Bursa Province in Turkey
 Nilüfer River, the classical Odrysses, near Bursa, Turkey

Others
 Bursa Nilüfer S.A.Ş., a sports club in Nilüfer, Bursa, Turkey
 Nilüfer Belediyespor, a multi-sports club in Nilüfer, Bursa, Turkey
 Nilüfer Belediyespor Women's Volleyball Team, women's volleyball side of Nilüfer Belediyespor in Bursa, Turkey
 Nilüfer Dam, a dam on Nilüfer River in Bursa, Turkey

See also
Nelufar Hedayat
Nilufar (disambiguation)

Given names derived from plants or flowers
Turkish feminine given names